City Hospital-Gaston Memorial Hospital is a historic hospital complex located at Gastonia, Gaston County, North Carolina. The complex consists of: the 1924 Classical Revival style City Hospital designed by architect Charles Coker Wilson; the 1951 Gaston Memorial Hospital; the 1957 addition that connects them; and a 1947 nurses’ school and dormitory.  The original section is a four-story, 12 bay by 3 bay, brick building.

It was listed on the National Register of Historic Places in 2011.

References

Hospital buildings on the National Register of Historic Places in North Carolina
Neoclassical architecture in North Carolina
Hospital buildings completed in 1924
Buildings and structures in Gaston County, North Carolina
National Register of Historic Places in Gaston County, North Carolina